Rod Laver and Dennis Ralston won the title, defeating Bob Hewitt and Frew McMillan 7–6(8–6), 7–6(7–3) in the final.

Seeds

Draw

Finals

Top half

Bottom half

External links
 Draw

U.S. Pro Indoor
1976 World Championship Tennis circuit
U.S. Pro Indoor Doubles
1976 in American tennis